Guru Har Sahai Assembly constituency (Sl. No.: 78) is a Punjab Legislative Assembly constituency in Firozepur district, Punjab state, India.

Members of Legislative Assembly

Election results

2022

2017

References

External links
  

Assembly constituencies of Punjab, India
Firozpur district